Stoneking is a surname. Notable people with the surname include:

 Billy Marshall Stoneking (born 1947), Australian-American poet, playwright, filmmaker, and teacher
 C. W. Stoneking (born 1974), Australian blues singer-songwriter and guitar and banjo player, son of the above
 Mark Stoneking (born 1956), American geneticist

See also